KTN may refer to:

Television
 KTN (television channel), Pakistan
 Kenya Television Network
 Korean Television Network, a subchannel of WKTB-CD
 Television Nagasaki, Japan

Transport
 Kentish Town station, London, National Rail station code KTN
 Ketchikan International Airport, Alaska, US, IATA and FAA code KTN

Other uses
 Known Traveler Number for US Trusted Traveler Programs such as Global Entry

See also